Blindness is a 2016 Polish drama film directed by Ryszard Bugajski. It was screened in the Contemporary World Cinema section at the 2016 Toronto International Film Festival.

Cast
 Maria Mamona as Julia Brystygier
 Malgorzata Zajaczkowska as Sister Benedicta
 Janusz Gajos as Father Cieciorka
 Marek Kalita as The Primate, Cardinal Wyszynski
 Bartosz Porczyk as Prisoner
 Kazimierz Kaczor as Mourner
 Slawomir Orzechowski as Caretaker
 Marcin Tronski as Bartender

Plot 
The action of the film takes place in the second half of the 1950s in Warsaw and the Institute for the Blind in Laski. Julia Brystiger is no longer an officer of the security apparatus of the People's Republic of Poland, she works as an editor in a publishing house and is now investigated by the Security Services herself. Looking for spiritual advice, she tries to meet with Primate Stefan Wyszyński. Before she confronts the Primate of the Millennium, Julia will have to convince a nun who is experiencing a crisis of faith and a priest who was blinded by the security service during the interrogation.

References

External links
 

2016 films
2016 drama films
Polish drama films
2010s Polish-language films
Films directed by Ryszard Bugajski